Grevillea dielsiana, commonly known as Diels grevillea, is a species of flowering plant in the family Proteaceae and is endemic to the south-west of Western Australia. It is a spreading shrub with divided leaves, the end lobes linear and tapering, and groups of red or orange flowers, often with streaks of pink or cream.

Description
The style is red or pink, pale pink or white near the tip.

Taxonomy
Grevillea dielsiana was first formally described in 1943 by Charles Gardner in the Journal of the Royal Society of Western Australia from material he collected near the Murchison River. The specific epithet (dielsiana) honours Ludwig Diels.

Distribution and habitat
Diels grevillea grows in heath or shrubland between Geraldton, Mullewa and Shark Bay in the Avon Wheatbelt, Geraldton Sandplains and Yalgoo biogeographic regions of south-western Western Australia.

Conservation status
Grevillea dielsiana is listed as "not threatened" by the Western Australian Government Department of Parks and Wildlife

References

dielsiana
Eudicots of Western Australia
Proteales of Australia
Taxa named by Charles Gardner
Plants described in 1943